Fred Gerber Jr. was a member of the South Dakota House of Representatives.

Biography
Gerber was born on May 1, 1870 in Spring Green, Wisconsin. He died on May 13, 1941 in Sioux Falls, South Dakota and is buried in Worthing, South Dakota.

Career
Gerber was a member of the House of Representatives from 1919 to 1922. He was a Republican.

References

People from Spring Green, Wisconsin
Republican Party members of the South Dakota House of Representatives
1870 births
1941 deaths